Wakefield Press is an American independent publishing house based in Cambridge, Massachusetts. The press specializes in publishing avant-garde literature in translation. Wakefield was founded in 2009 by Marc Lowenthal and Judy Feldmann. The aim of the company is to increase the availability in English of obscure and avant garde authors from the past who wrote in foreign languages.

Wakefield has been praised in the literary world for its promotion of provocative and unusual texts, as well as for its introductions to each text with detailed information relevant to the author's life, and background providing context for the nature of the author's work.

Notable authors 
 Marcel Schwob
 Unica Zürn
 Paul Scheerbart
 Charles Fourier
 Pierre Louÿs
 Honoré de Balzac
 Léon Bloy
 Salomo Friedlaender

References

Publishing companies established in 2009
Book publishing companies based in Massachusetts
Companies based in Cambridge, Massachusetts